A student publication is a media outlet such as a newspaper, magazine, television show, or radio station produced by students at an educational institution. These publications typically cover local and school-related news, but they may also report on national or international news as well. Most student publications are either part of a curricular class or run as an extracurricular activity.

Student publications serve as both a platform for community discussion and a place for those interested in journalism to develop their skills. These publications report news, publish opinions of students and faculty, and may run advertisements catered to the student body. Besides these purposes, student publications also serve as a watchdog to uncover problems at the respective institution. The majority of student publications are funded through their educational institution. Some funds may be generated through sales and advertisements, but the majority usually comes from the school itself. Because of this, educational institutions have specific ways in which they can influence the publications through funding.

Online student publications 

Due to the rise in adoption of Internet accessible devices such as computers and smartphones, many high schools and colleges have begun offering online editions of their publications in addition to printed copies.  (The very first student newspaper in the United States to completely abandon its printed issues in favor of a website was The Campus Lantern at Eastern Connecticut State University, doing so in the 2000s; however paper issues of The Lantern have since been brought back.) Due to publishing content online student publications are now able to reach a much wider audience than before. With many student publications moving to online, content is more accessible to the student body and production of the content is easier and cheaper. As printed student publications become more and more scarce and student publications move online to best fit the news needs of today's students, student newspapers will run into several issues. One of these issues is the increase in demand for new content. While an update once a day or even once a week was once acceptable for a student publication, real time information resources will soon be demanded by students who grew up with constant updates of news coverage. This shift in content demand will require more effort and more time by the student newspaper staff.

One of these issues is what is called the "daily me." Coined by Cass Sunstein in his book Republic.com, the "daily me" is the current trend of online readers looking for personalized information providers. In this way the reader deals with only the subjects they wish to deal with. In this way readers are not inconvenienced by material they have no interest in and can personalize an information product themselves, providing added value to both themselves and the provider. However, some believe this trend may not be the best for society, who is now faced with a public that chooses how well to be informed. On a campus paper, this trend will likely manifest itself in the increased number of "hits" to the common "sports" and "opinion" sections of the paper, while hard news sections go un-noticed. This new type of print culture could possibly result in drastic formatting and content changes for student newspapers.

2006 cartoon controversies 

Gair rhydd, the student paper at Cardiff University, courted controversy when, on February 4, 2006, it reproduced the cartoons, originally printed in Jyllands-Posten, depicting Muhammad. The issue was withdrawn from publication within a day of being released, the editor and two other student journalists were suspended, and a public apology was published in the next issue.

In the same month, two editors of the Daily Illini, the independent student newspaper of the University of Illinois at Urbana–Champaign, were suspended after deciding to publish six of the twelve cartoons.

However, student publications took a lead role in reprinting the Muhammad cartoons, often accompanying them with explanatory editorials. No fewer than 16 student newspapers and magazines in the United States, and a handful in other countries, ran one or more of the caricatures.

Student press in Australia

University student newspapers in the Australia are usually independent of university administration yet are connected with or run by the student representative organisation operating at the campus. Editors tend to be elected by the student body on a separate ticket to other student representatives and are paid an honorarium, although some student organisations have been known to employ unelected staff to coordinate the production of the newspaper (an example of this is the national Student View newspaper).

Controversy surrounding Australian student press
Australian student newspapers have courted controversy since their inception. One of the more notorious of these controversies involved the publication of an article which allegedly incited readers to shoplift. The July edition of the magazine was banned by the Office of Film and Literature Classification following a campaign by conservative talkback radio hosts and other media to have the material banned. The four editors of the July 1995 edition of La Trobe University student magazine Rabelais were subsequently charged with publishing, distributing and depositing an objectionable publication. An objectional publication was defined in this case, as one that incites criminal activity. The editors lodged an appeal, which led to a protracted four-year court case. The appeal was eventually defeated by the full bench of the Federal Court, who refused the editors application to appeal to the High Court of Australia. The charges were eventually dropped in March 1999.

Student press in Canada

Many student newspapers in Canada are independent from their universities and student unions. Such autonomous papers are funded by student fees won by referendums, as well as advertising, and are run by their staffs, with no faculty input.

About 55 of Canada's student newspapers belong to a co-operative and newswire service called the Canadian University Press, which holds conferences, has correspondents across the country, is run democratically by its member papers, and fosters a sense of community among Canadian student journalists.

The oldest continually published student newspapers in Canada are The Varsity (1880), The Queen's Journal (1873), and The Dalhousie Gazette (1868). The oldest student publication in Canada is The Brunswickan, which was founded in 1867 as a monthly but then switched to a weekly newspaper.

The only Canadian student newspaper that continues to print on a daily schedule is [[The UWO Gazette|The Gazette]] at the University of Western Ontario.

Student press in Ireland
Student publications are produced at Ireland's universities and Institutes of Technology as well as to a lesser extent at Colleges of Further Education. These publications include The College Tribune and The University Observer at University College Dublin, Trinity News and The University Times at Trinity College Dublin, The College View based at Dublin City University and Sin Newspaper at NUI Galway. Other publications include The Edition (stylised as the eDITion),  at Dublin Institute of Technology and the UCC Express and Motley Magazine at University College Cork.

Each publication reports on affairs at its host university as well as on local, national and international news of relevance to students and many student journalists have gone on to work in Ireland's national press. All student publications in Ireland are funded by or linked to their host university or its students' union, with the exception of UCD's College Tribune which operates independently. Irish student publications are invited each year to enter the national Student Media Awards, run by a Dublin-based marketing firm Oxygen.ie under various categories.

Student press in Korea
Almost every university in Korea runs a student based press. Although many of these press are funded by the school, the students press has a significant amount of say amongst the student body.

Student press in the Philippines

The College Editors Guild of the Philippines or (CEGP) is the oldest and broadest intercollegiate alliance of student publications in the Asia-Pacific. Since its foundation, the guild has remained steadfast in its commitment to uphold freedom of expression, press freedom and students' democratic rights. This dedication is what continues to unite and consolidate CEGP's more than 750 member publications from different schools nationwide or worldwide. See also List of student newspapers

Student press in the United Kingdom

Student newspapers in the UK are often given a constitutionally guaranteed editorial independence from the universities and student unions whose students they represent, although the majority are financially dependent on their Students' Union. The most successful (in terms of student media awards) include: Orbital Magazine (Royal Holloway, University of London), The Knowledge (University of Plymouth), Nouse (University of York), York Vision (University of York), Impact (University of Nottingham), The Epinal (Loughborough University), Felix (Imperial College), Cherwell, The Oxford Student (University of Oxford), The Badger (University of Sussex), gair rhydd (Cardiff University), The Beaver (London School of Economics), Glasgow University Guardian (Glasgow University), The Boar (University of Warwick), Leeds Student (University of Leeds), Student (University of Edinburgh), Forge Press (University of Sheffield), The Courier (University of Newcastle), The Saint (University of St Andrews), Varsity, The Cambridge Student, The Tab (University of Cambridge), Epigram (University of Bristol), The Ripple (newspaper) (University of Leicester), Exeposé (University of Exeter) Spark* (University of Reading), The Gaudie (University of Aberdeen)and LeNurb (Brunel University). Examples of British student newspapers that are financially as well as editorially independent from their respective student unions are Cherwell, Varsity, The Tab, The Saint, The Epinal, The Linc (University of Lincoln), Palatinate (Durham University), The Founder (Royal Holloway) Milk Magazine (Bath Spa University), The Gown (Queen's University, Belfast) and The Manchester Magazine (University of Manchester). Since they are not part of their Students' Union at all, their independence is given a stronger guarantee than other papers who rely on their unions for funding and consequently cover stories with that in mind.

In 2003, The National Student, the UK's first independent national student newspaper was launched. Scotcampus a similar publication based in Scotland was founded in 2001. In 2009, The Student Journals was founded as an independent online magazine for students, but started allowing international writers one year after launch.

Student press in the United States

Case law

Tinker v. Des Moines Independent Community School District

Tinker v. Des Moines concerns a group of students who wanted to wear black armbands to school in 1965 to protest United States involvement in Vietnam. After school officials heard about the planned silent protest, they suspended the students involved. A few of the students involved sued and the Supreme Court sided with the students, saying that provided that these speech acts did not distract themselves or others from academic work, the real purpose of the school, then students were free to wear and say want they liked in school. This is considered the benchmark case in issues of student free speech and contains the famous phrase "students do not shed their constitutional rights at the schoolhouse gate."

Hazelwood School District v. Kuhlmeier

Hazelwood School District v. Kuhlmeier, heard by the United States Supreme Court in 1987 concerned a public school newspaper that attempted to print two controversial stories about issues of teen pregnancy and divorced families. It was the custom of the principal to look over the proposed paper before publication. With little time left before the publication deadline, the principal decided that the two stories, though names had been changed to protect the stories' subjects, were inappropriate for the paper's younger readers; under direction of the principal, the paper was printed without the offending stories. The students filed suit, but the Supreme Court stood by the principal's ruling, that, because of time constraints, the only proper course of action was to not print the stories. It was decided that the students' First Amendment rights had not been infringed. This case is often cited by high schools and universities to support the custom of prior review.

Kincaid v. Gibson

Interaction of court rulings
Hazelwood and Tinker offer conflicting versions of student free expression. Student-directed publications may indeed be considered open or limited public forums for student expression, offering students freedom of expression under both Hazelwood and Tinker.

Hazelwood, for example, does not say administrators must review or censor their papers before publication. In fact, journalism education organizations, like the Journalism Education Association, argue that prior review has no legitimate educational merit and is only a tool leading to censorship.

Under certain limited conditions and situations presented by Hazelwood, school administrators may be permitted prior review of (mostly high school) student publications.

Until June 2005, the Hazelwood standard was not considered to apply to public college and university newspapers, a decision most recently affirmed in the 2001 appeals court decision in Kincaid v. Gibson. However, in June 2005, the 7th Circuit Court of Appeals ruled, in Hosty v. Carter, that the Hazelwood standard could apply to student publications that were not "designated public forums," and in February 2006 the Supreme Court declined to hear the students' appeal. At this time, the Hosty decision applies only in the states of Illinois, Indiana and Wisconsin.

In response to the Kincaid decision, the California State Legislature passed AB 2581, which extended existing state-level statutory protection of high school student journalists to college and university students. The bill was signed into law by Governor Arnold Schwarzenegger and took effect on January 1, 2007.

Controversy over alleged censorship actions has led some student newspapers to become independent organizations, such as The Exponent of Purdue University in 1969, The Daily Californian of the University of California, Berkeley in 1971, The Daily Orange of Syracuse University in 1971, The Independent Florida Alligator of the University of Florida in 1973, The Cavalier Daily of the University of Virginia in 1979, The Paisano of the University of Texas at San Antonio in 1981, and most recently The Mountaineer Jeffersonian of West Virginia University in 2008.

Some states have laws which enhance the U.S. Constitution in protecting student expression documented by the Student Press Law Center.

John Silber and university newspapers
University administrations have learned to get around constitutional protections and effectively diminish critical student newspapers by following the example of former Boston University President John Silber, who on the advice of Harvard Law School Professor Alan Dershowitz, eliminated all funding for student newspapers in the 1970s in an attempt to suppress on-campus criticism. Silber's policy went so far as to ban student organizations funded by the university from placing advertisements in the student press. With his hands-off policy, Silber was able to eliminate the independence of The Daily News and financially crippled the more-radical 
b.u. exposure. The exposure sued Silber and the university for infringement of their First Amendment rights, but the courts of the Commonwealth of Massachusetts eventually dismissed their case.

Issues of diversity in student newspapers
Studies by the Journal of Blacks in Higher Education (JBHE) focusing on African American students have found that as few as 2.6% of editors of all student newspapers are of African-American descent, with other minorities showing similar trending. These numbers are not much higher at schools with credited journalism schools. In these institutions, only 4.4% of editors are of African American descent. Both of these percentages are significantly below the percentage of population African- Americans make up in the total United States. Such skewed demographics in these publications could result in newspapers that only reflect the outlooks and values of a particular segment of the student population. The JBHE does not suggest any type of affirmative action program for student publications at this point in time.

Student newspaper in popular culture
TV series Beverly Hills, 90210: Andrea Zuckerman (Gabrielle Carteris) is the school newspaper editor.
Argentinean TV series Rebelde Way: Pilar Dunoff (Micaela Vázquez) write a newspaper anonymously, filled with gossip about her classmates.
TV series Smallville: Chloe Sullivan (Allison Mack) is the editor of the school newspaper The Torch.
Israeli TV series Noga Caspi (Ayelet Zurer) is the editor of the school newspaper.
Beware the Gonzo is about geek at his high school who decides to establish an underground paper of his own.
TV series Riverdale: Betty Cooper (Lili Reinhart) and Jughead Jones (Cole Sprouse) are editors of Riverdale High's previously dormant school newspaper, The Blue & Gold.
 Lindsay Lohan is a school newspaper columnist in Disney Channel Original Movie Get a Clue.

See also
Canadian University Press
Journalism
Journalism Education Association
List of student newspapers
National Student Press Week
Society of Collegiate Journalists
Student Press Law Center

References

External links

 National Scholastic Press Association
Journalism Education Association's Scholastic Press Rights Commission
Youth Journalism International
Student Press Law Center
ASNE High School Journalism Initiative
ASNE's my.hsj.org service, the largest scholastic news site
Student Reporter

Ephemera

Youth in Canada
Youth in the United States
Publications